"Sweet Melody" is a song by British girl group Little Mix, released through RCA Records on 23 October 2020, as the third single from the group's sixth studio album Confetti (2020). The song was co written and produced by Tayla Parx, Morten Ristorp, Robin Frid, Brian Garcia, and MNEK. Described as a dance-pop song, incorporating bouncy reggaeton drum beats, it lyrically addresses the ending of relationship and the deception that follows. It was the group's last music video as a quartet before Jesy Nelson left the group in the same year.

"Sweet Melody" was met with acclaim from critics, with some citing it as a stand out song amongst their recent singles, with Billboard naming it as one of the Best Songs of 2020. The single was a commercial success, peaking at number-one on the UK Singles Chart in January 2021, and becoming the group's fifth number-one single on the charts. It also became their first number-one single in the UK since "Shout Out to My Ex" was released in 2016. It charted in twenty other music markets, including reaching the top ten in five other territories. It has been certified platinum by the British Phographic Industry (BPI), certified platinum by Pro-Música Brasil (PMB), and certified gold by the Polish Phonographic Industry. The group performed the track at the 2020 MTV Europe Music Awards, The Jonathan Ross Show, and Little Mix The Search.

Background
On 18 October 2020, the group posted a teaser video to Twitter, hinting at a forthcoming announcement. The next day, they posted an official announcement and release date for the song along with a preview of the track. In November 2020, during an interview for Gay Times producer MNEK revealed "Sweet Melody" was originally crafted for a Demi Lovato songwriting camp three years prior. It was later offered to Selena Gomez, JoJo, Zara Larsson and Hailee Steinfeld before eventually being pitched to Little Mix.

Critical reception 
"Sweet Melody" was met with acclaim from music critics. Jordan Robledo of Gay Times, said: "Sweet Melody is an empowering track that touches upon on the ending of relationships and the deception that follows. It is also showstopping stand out amongst their recent singles."

Alexis Petrdis of The Guardian, described the song as a standout single incorporating reggaeton beats. Elisa Bray from i-News said "the song boasts an infectious tune with feisty lyrics matching its Latin rhythm." Will Hodgekinson of The Times said "The lyrics 'He would lie, he would cheat over syncopated beats," shows the group singing of an unnamed boy band member on the Latin-tinged track that is Sweet Melody,".

Billboard, named the song as one of the best of 2020, stating "Sweet melody is a slick banger that sees the group delivering a sizzling takedown of some dude in a band who "would lie, would cheat, over syncopated beats." The song was also included on their list of best pop songs of 2020. In the same year it was named as favourite song of the year in a voting poll done by Billboard.

Attitude included the song #3 on their list of 32 greatest Little Mix singles of all time writing "Sweet Melody was an instant girl group classic. It’s one of those songs with little details in the production and vocals that open itself up to you more and more each time you listen."

Year-end lists

Music video
The band teased the music video of the song with posts to social media on 21 October 2020, stating that it was coming soon. A day later, Little Mix announced via Twitter that the music video would be released on 23 October where it was uploaded to YouTube. On 20 November, an official lyric video made by a fan was released to the group's YouTube channel. On 27 November, the official vertical video version was uploaded to their YouTube channel.
This is the last music video as a quartet as Jesy Nelson left the group in December 2020. In 2021, she revealed that she was rushed to hospital during the video shoot after suffering from panic attacks stemming from her eating disorder which was particularly worsened by the label's demands during the COVID-19 pandemic, after which her mother advised the other three members that she should leave the group to concentrate on her mental health.

Live performances
The debut performance of "Sweet Melody" was on the first live show of Little Mix The Search. Group member Jade Thirlwall was absent on the day of the performance as she was self-isolating as a precaution at the time, after several members of the production crew had tested positive for COVID-19 a week prior. On 8 November, Little Mix performed "Sweet Melody" at the 2020 MTV Europe Music Awards, which they also hosted. On 21 November, Little Mix performed the song on The Jonathan Ross Show.

Commercial performance
"Sweet Melody" entered at number eight on the UK Singles Chart for the week ending 5 November 2020, becoming their 16th top ten hit on the chart. It also became their highest charting single since Woman Like Me (2018). "Sweet Melody" reached the top of the UK Singles Chart in the week ending 14 January 2021, becoming Little Mix's fifth number one on the chart, and their first since "Shout Out to My Ex" in October 2016. This moved Little Mix to joint 11th on the list of artists with most number-one singles on the UK Singles Chart. It was the group's first chart-topper since the departure of founding member Jesy Nelson, although her vocals are on the song. It later surpassed Shout Out to My Ex and Touch, becoming the group's longest-reigning Top 5 single.  It spent a total of thirteen weeks inside the top 10 of the UK Charts, becoming their longest running Top 10 single there. 

Outside of the United Kingdom "Sweet Melody" also topped the charts in North Macedonia, Scotland, and the Official Big Top 40 charts, breaking the record for the group with the most number-ones. The song reached the top ten in four other music markets including Ireland, becoming the band's tenth top ten single in the country. It later reached a new peak of number seven, and was their first top ten hit in Ireland since "Woman Like Me" which peaked at number three on the Irish Singles Chart in 2018. "Sweet Melody" charted in thirteen other territories including Lithuania, Portugal and Switzerland.

Track listing
Digital download and streaming
 "Sweet Melody" – 3:33

Digital download and streaming – PS1 remix
 "Sweet Melody"  – 3:30

Digital download and streaming – Alle Farben remix
 "Sweet Melody"  – 3:21

Digital download and streaming – karaoke
 "Sweet Melody"  – 3:30

Charts

Weekly charts

Year-end charts

Accolades

Certifications

Release history

See also
 List of UK top-ten singles in 2020
 List of UK top-ten singles in 2021
 List of top 10 singles in 2020 (Ireland)
 List of top 10 singles in 2021 (Ireland)
 List of UK Singles Downloads Chart number ones of the 2020s
 List of UK Singles Chart number ones of the 2020s

References

External links
 
 
 

2020 singles
Little Mix songs
Number-one singles in Scotland
UK Singles Chart number-one singles
Songs about heartache
Songs written by MNEK
Songs written by Morten Ristorp
Songs written by Tayla Parx
2020 songs